COLI may refer to:
corporate-owned life insurance
China Overseas Land and Investment Limited
cost-of-living index
Colonel's Island Railroad

See also
 Coli (disambiguation)